The Willshire Baronetcy, of the East Indies, was a title in the Baronetage of the United Kingdom. It was created on 22 May 1841 for Major-General Sir Thomas Willshire. The title became extinct on the death of the third Baronet in 1947.

Willshire baronets, of the East Indies (1841)
Sir Thomas Willshire, 1st Baronet (1789–1862)
Sir Arthur Reginald Thomas Willshire, 2nd Baronet (1850–1919)
Sir Gerard Arthur Maxwell Willshire, 3rd Baronet (1892–1947)

References

Extinct baronetcies in the Baronetage of the United Kingdom